Doctor Spin was a pseudonym used by Andrew Lloyd Webber and record producer  Nigel Wright for their 1992 hit single "Tetris".

Biography
Lloyd Webber is more widely known as a composer of musical theatre.

"Tetris" itself was an early 1990s Eurodance cover version of the most famous tune in the Game Boy version of the game Tetris (which was in turn an instrumental version of the Russian folk song "Korobeiniki"). Tetris was the free game bundled with the Game Boy.

"Tetris" was popular at the time, and the single reached number 6 in the UK Singles Chart. Doctor Spin itself may be considered a one-hit wonder ("Tetris" was their sole entry on the UK Singles Chart, and there is no evidence of any other releases under that name). However, Lloyd Webber and Wright themselves have worked together on many other successful projects. Wright produced Bombalurina's 1990 hit cover of "Itsy Bitsy Teenie Weenie Yellow Polka Dot Bikini" (which Lloyd Webber was also involved with), and has subsequently worked on a number of Lloyd Webber's cast albums.

Discography

Singles

See also
 Tetris (Game Boy)

References

English dance music groups
English electronic music groups
British techno music groups